The Nyawigi people, also spelt Nyawaygi, Nywaigi, or Nawagi, are an Aboriginal Australian people whose original country was around Halifax Bay in Far North Queensland.

They may also have inhabited Orpheus Island.

Language

An early record suggested that the Nyawa-(Nowa) in this term denoted 'no', and comparative linguistics has observed the –gi form a comitative suffix, but the last speakers could not confirm this speculative derivation of the ethnonym. One of the last to be interviewed was a centenarian, Long Heron.

Country
The Nywaigi are a coastal people occupying 50 miles of coastland to a depth of some 15 kilometres. To their north, bounded on the west by the Toobanna, Frances Creek and Waterview Creek, over the Herbert River at Halifax and Ingham, were the Biyaygiri. To the west was Warrongo country. Their southern boundary lay at the Seaview Range. Other neighbours include the Warrgamay. The Warrgamay lay around the sclerophyll forest to their east on the coast, though, according to Robert M. W. Dixon, the Nyawagyi did access part of the sea-coast in the vicinity of Ingham.

Social structure
The Nyawagyi comprised 7 tribes, with the affix bara indicating belonging, and all probably speaking a distinctive dialect.
 Ikelbara.
 Doulebara.
 Mungulbara.
 Mandambara.
 Karabara.
 Bungabara.
 Yoembara.

The Nyawagyi had four sections: (a)wungu; (b)gurguɽu; (c) gurgila=gurgiŋ; (d) gaɽbawuɽu. The marriage rules laid down that

 A wungu male had to marry a gurguɽugan woman, their offspring becoming gurgila=gurgiŋ.
 A gurguɽu male married a wungurayŋgan to produce gaɽbawuɽu.
 A gurgila=gurgiŋ male married a gaɽbawuɽiyan, producing wungu children.
 A gaɽbawuɽu male married a gurgilayŋgan, and their offspring would be gurguɽu.

Alternative names
 Nyawigi
 Geugagi

Notes

Citations

Sources

Aboriginal peoples of Queensland
Far North Queensland